Curling Alberta is the regional governing body for the sport of curling in Alberta.  It was incorporated in 2018 as an amalgamate of the Alberta Curling Federation (ACF), the Northern Alberta Curling Association (NACA), the Southern Alberta Curling Association (SACA), and the Peace Curling Association (PCA). Curling clubs in the Northern Rockies Regional Municipality and Peace River Regional District of British Columbia are also members of Curling Alberta (and previously the PCA), as opposed to Curl BC.

Provincial championships 
Curling Alberta hosts ten provincial championships annually:

 Juniors
 Alberta Scotties Tournament of Hearts (Women's)
 Boston Pizza Cup (Men's)
 Mixed Doubles
 Seniors
 Masters
 U18
 Wheelchair
 Mixed
 Club

See also 

 List of curling clubs in Alberta

References

External links 

 Official Site

Curling governing bodies in Canada
Curling in Alberta
Sports governing bodies in Alberta